Hamed Noormohammadi (born May 22, 1986) is an Iranian football player who currently plays for Zob Ahan Esfahan in the Persian Gulf Pro League.

Club career
Noormohammadi has played his entire career for Rah Ahan.

Club career statistics
Last Update  21 January 2016 

 Assist Goals

References
 

1986 births
Living people
Iranian footballers
Sportspeople from Tehran
Rah Ahan players
Pars Jonoubi Jam players
Malavan players
Association football defenders
Naft Masjed Soleyman F.C. players
Mes Rafsanjan players